The Roman Catholic Diocese of Oyem is a diocese located in the city of Oyem in the Ecclesiastical province of Libreville in Gabon.

History
 29 May 1969: Established as Diocese of Oyem from the Metropolitan Archdiocese of Libreville
 19 March 2003: Lost territory to the erection of the Apostolic Prefecture of Makokou.

Bishops of Oyem 
 François Ndong (29 May 1969 – 23 August 1982)
 Basile Mvé Engone, S.D.B. (23 August 1982 – 3 April 1998), appointed archbishop of Libreville
 Jean-Vincent Ondo Eyene (18 March 2000 – present)

Coadjutor Bishops
Basile Mvé Engone, S.D.B. (1980-1982)

See also
Roman Catholicism in Gabon

References

External links 
 GCatholic.org
 Catholic Hierarchy

Roman Catholic dioceses in Gabon
Christian organizations established in 1969
Roman Catholic dioceses and prelatures established in the 20th century
Roman Catholic Ecclesiastical Province of Libreville